Bearwood is a suburb of Poole, Dorset, England.

Bearwood is centred on a supermarket and medical and neighbourhood centre in King John Avenue. The area was mainly developed in the 1980s on what had been open heathland. The roads are named after titles of English nobility and people linked to the signing of Magna Carta. This is derived from the fact that the oldest road in the area, a part of the Wimborne to Bournemouth road, is called Magna Road as it passes through the village of Canford Magna en route.

There is School and Nursery in the area, Bearwood Primary and Nursery School. There is also a Preschool, Bearwood Pre-School.

Public transport
Buses operated by morebus (Wilts & Dorset) serves Bearwood:
 Service 6/6a From Wimbourne via Bearwood to Bournemouth
 Service 11 goes to Poole via Alderney.
 Service 32 twice daily service from Poole to Bournemouth via Bearwood and Merley.

 The shoreline 54 goes to Castlepoint via Bournemouth schools. 
 Service 50 and 86 also offers school services.

Recent developments
In 2007, the local community centre was re-furbished with new equipment and bar for the youth projects to move to from the St Barnabas Church.

2011
 The local council approved plans for the new Poole Football Stadium in the west of Bearwood off Magna Road.
 The local church was extended and refurbished.
 The local play area was completely rebuilt with an extended area with zip-wires, climbing frames and bike ramps.
 In November The Co-operative Group announced to the community that the store and pharmacy was going to be refurbished to a new state-of-the art design.

2012
 King John Avenue, the main road in Bearwood was completely re-surfaced.
 The new Co-operative food store and pharmacy opened in late April 2012.

2019
 A new housing estate was completed on the outskirts of the settlement on Magna Road.

Local attractions
 Bearwood Community Centre and Social club
 Canford Magna Arena, where firework displays, concerts and other events are regularly held.

Politics 
Bearwood is part of the Bearwood and Merley ward, which elects 3 councillors to Bournemouth, Christchurch and Poole Council.

References

External links

Areas of Poole